Jocelyne Bourassa, CM (May 30, 1947 – August 3, 2021) was a Canadian professional golfer, who had a distinguished amateur career. She was Rookie of the Year on the LPGA Tour in 1972, and ended her career with one victory on the tour.

Amateur career
Bourassa was born in Shawinigan, Quebec. She studied Physical Education at the Université de Montréal where she was a member of the volleyball, basketball, skiing and track and field teams.

Bourassa won the Quebec Junior golf championship in 1963, 1964, and 1965. In 1965, she also captured the Canadian Women's Amateur. She repeated as the national amateur champion in 1971 then turned professional in 1972.

Professional career
Bourassa won LPGA Rookie of the Year honors in 1972. The following year she won the first-ever La Canadienne golf championship, now the Canadian Women's Open. She was the only Canadian woman to win the Canadian Women's Open until Brooke Henderson in 2018.

Honours
Bourassa won the Bobbie Rosenfeld Award in 1972 as Canada's best female athlete.

Bourassa was made a Member of the Order of Canada in 1972.

Bourassa was elected to the Quebec Sports Hall of Fame in 1992, the Quebec Golf Hall of Fame in 1995, the Canadian Golf Hall of Fame in 1996, and Canada's Sports Hall of Fame in 2015.

Amateur wins (15)
this list may be incomplete
1963 Quebec Junior, Quebec Amateur
1964 Quebec Junior
1965 Quebec Junior, Canadian Women's Amateur
1967 Eastern Province Championship, Scottish Girls Open Stroke Play Championship
1968 Eastern Province Championship
1969 Eastern Province Championship, Quebec Amateur
1970 Eastern Province Championship, World Amateur Championships (individual)
1971 Canadian Women's Amateur, Ontario Amateur, New Zealand Women's Amateur, Quebec Amateur

Professional wins (1)

LPGA Tour wins (1)

Note: Bourassa won the La Canadienne (which became the du Maurier Classic) before it became a major championship.

LPGA Tour playoff record (1–1)

References

External links
 
 Canadian Golf Hall of Fame profile

Canadian female golfers
LPGA Tour golfers
Winners of ladies' major amateur golf championships
Golfing people from Quebec
Members of the Order of Canada
Sportspeople from Shawinigan
1947 births
2021 deaths